Reem Kherici (born 13 February 1983) is a French film director and actress of Tunisian and Italian descent. In 2013 she wrote and directed her first film and in 2017 she wrote and appeared in the romantic comedy film "Jour J" (D Day).

Life 
Kherici was born in France in 1983. Her parents were immigrants as her mother is Italian and her father is Tunisian. He was ambitious for her to have a career in science and he was disappointed when she became an actor.

She came to notice on the radio in 2002 on Fun Radio. The following year she was the host of a TV programme Girls of the Weekend on Fun TV. In 2004 she met Philippe Lacheau, alias Fifi and she appeared intermitantly on La Cave à l'Info with Fifi and his troupe. In 2005, the Band to Fifi was on TV every night in Le Grand Journal by Canal +, with Birthdays and is noticed during the 59 th Cannes Film Festival for his live skits.

In 2006–2007, the Bande à Fifi was presenting live every weekday, within Canal +'s Grand Journal.

In 2009, she took part in the W9 program Chut, chut, chut with the same Fifi troupe and also on France 4 as a recurring guest in The Open Door to All Windows , a program presented by Cyril Hanouna. She also took a major part in the spy spoof film, OSS 117: Lost in Rio which was released in 2009.

In 2013 she write, directed and starred in the romantic comedy film "Paris at any Price".

In 2020 she was a celebrity chosen to appear in an Amazon programme where comedians compete for a prize by getting each other to laugh.

Personal life
In 2004, she dated Philippe Lacheau. She had a son with Gilles Lemaire in 2019.

Filmography

Theater

Television

References

External links 

 

1983 births
French film actresses
French television actresses
French stage actresses
People from Neuilly-sur-Seine
Living people
21st-century French actresses
French comedians
French women comedians